The 2007–08 FAW Premier Cup was the 11th season of the tournament since its founding in 1997. Newport County were the eventual winners, beating Llanelli 1–0 in the final to win the competition for the first time in the club's history.

To date, the season remains the last time the tournament was played after the BBC withdrew sponsorship in 2008.

Calendar

First round

Second round

Quarter-finals
All three Welsh sides competing in the Football League, Cardiff City, Swansea City and Wrexham, entered in the quarter-finals along with reigning holders The New Saints. Due to heavy rain, several of the quarter-final ties were postponed on more than one occasion resulting in the round lasting more than one month.

Semi-finals

Final

Top scorers

References

2007-08
2